Cursed is the fourth studio album by American band Righteous Vendetta. The album was released on March 17, 2017 through Century Media Records.

Track listing

Personnel
Righteous Vendetta
Ryan Hayes – vocals
Justin Olmstead – lead guitar
Justin Smith – rhythm guitar
Riley Haynie – bass, samples
Zack Goggins – drums, percussion

Additional
Mitchell Marlow – producer, mixing
Don Robertson – executive producer
Howie Weinberg – mastering
Bekki Friesen – assistant engineer
Sara Kinne – product manager
Mike Gitter – A&R
Eve Saint Raven – artwork, layout

References

2017 albums
Century Media Records albums
Righteous Vendetta albums